Jaya Simhavarman II (Chinese: 刑卜施離值星霞弗; pinyin: Xíng Bǔ Shīlí Zhíxīngxiáfú), was a king of Champa, supposedly reigning from 1041 to 1044. He succeeded his father Shīlí Pílándéjiābámádié, perhaps Vikrantavarman IV (r. 1030–1041). In late 1042 he sent an envoy with tribute to the court of the Song dynasty.

Simhavarman II might have met with serious trouble during his short-lived reign. From the north, king Ly Thai Tong of Dai Viet accused Cham king's alleging raid in Dai Viet territory, henceforth he provoked war against Champa. In January 1044, the Dai Viet made a landfall in the coastal Huế-Da Nang region from the sea. The northern raiders plundered cities, ravaging the region, then battled against a counter Cham army led by the Cham king (he may be known as king Sạ Đẩu in the 14th-century Vietnamese chronicle Đại Việt sử lược). Unprepared, Simhavarman's army had been routed and himself was supposedly decapitated by the Dai Viet. 

Then in July, Ly Thai Tong took his soldiers and entered the city of Phật Thệ (Indrapura/Đồng Dương). The raiders sacked the city, took away the royal harem including a Cham princess named Mi E and 5,000 women, artisans, laborers, to the north.

After much surprise and chaos, a new Cham ruler came to power, with regnal name Jaya Paramesvaravarman I–who was a warrior born from a noble family.

Notes

References

Bibliography
 
  

 

Kings of Champa
11th-century Vietnamese monarchs
1044 deaths